Family Circle is a public artwork by the American artist Herbert House, located at 2300 6th Street NW on the Howard University campus in Washington, D.C., United States. Family Circle was surveyed as part of the Smithsonian's Save Outdoor Sculpture! survey in 1994.

Description
Four nude figures of a male, female and two children dance in a circle. The figures are highly polished steel and have no facial features, feet or hands. The dancing figures are on top of a red circular tilted platform.

Herbert House
Herbert House graduated from Illinois State University. He has been credited with creating over 500 works. House resides in Chicago, Illinois. His work is seen in the collections of Illinois State and numerous private collections.

Condition
This sculpture was surveyed in 1994 for its condition and it was described as "well maintained". In 2017, the sculpture was vandalized when two of the figures were torn off the platform. In 2018, the piece was fixed and back on display.

References

External links
"Who made the shiny car-bumper sculpture in an Adams" from The Washington Post
The Dr. Robert H. Derden Collection: A Black Collector's Odyssey in Contemporary Art
"Abstract" by House

Outdoor sculptures in Washington, D.C.
1991 sculptures
Steel sculptures in Washington, D.C.
Artworks in the collection of Howard University
Vandalized works of art in Washington, D.C.